The 1930 Ohio Bobcats football team was an American football team that represented Ohio University as a member of the Buckeye Athletic Association (BAA) during the 1930 college football season. In their seventh season under head coach Don Peden, the Bobcats compiled an 8–0–1 record, won the BAA championship, and outscored opponents by a total of 227 to 32. The 1930 season was the Bobcats' second consecutive undefeated season.

Schedule

References

Ohio
Ohio Bobcats football seasons
College football undefeated seasons
Ohio Bobcats football